Corolla is a genus of pelagic "sea butterflies". These are holoplanktonic opisthobranch molluscs belonging to the family Cymbuliidae. They are preyed upon by the gymnosome pteropods of the genus Cliopsis.

Species
Species within this genus include:
Corolla calceola (A. E. Verrill, 1880) -- Atlantic corolla
Distribution: Oceanic
Length: 40 mm
 Corolla chrysosticta (Troschel, 1854)
 Corolla cupula Rampal, 1996
Corolla intermedia (Tesch, 1903)
Distribution: Florida, Oceanic
Length: 39 mm
Corolla ovata Quoy & Gaimard, 1832
Distribution: Florida, Bermuda, Oceanic
Length: 40 mm
Corolla spectabilis (Dall, 1871)  Spectacular corolla

References

 Gofas, S.; Le Renard, J.; Bouchet, P. (2001). Mollusca, in: Costello, M.J. et al. (Ed.) (2001). European register of marine species: a check-list of the marine species in Europe and a bibliography of guides to their identification. Collection Patrimoines Naturels, 50: pp. 180–213

Cymbuliidae